Hall Hammond (May 18, 1902 – November 27, 1991) was an American jurist and politician who served as Chief Judge of the Court of Appeals and  Attorney General for the state of Maryland.

Hammond was born in Baltimore, Maryland to William S. Hammond and Rosalie Hall Hammond.  He received his early education from the Gilman School, the Jefferson School, and Baltimore City College.  He received his A.B. degree from Johns Hopkins University in 1923, and his LL.B. degree in 1925 from the University of Maryland School of Law.  He married Elizabeth Ashton Luck in 1934.

Hammond's early legal career was with the firm of Willis & Hudgins, whom he worked for from 1925 to 1929.  He began his own practice in 1929, which he maintained until 1952.  He served as Deputy Attorney General of Maryland from 1938 to 1946, and as Attorney General of Maryland from 1947 to 1952.  He also served as Secretary of the Alcoholic Beverage Survey Commission from 1942 to 1943.

Hammond was confirmed as an associate judge of the Maryland Court of Appeals in 1952, and, in 1966, he was confirmed as chief judge of the court.  While on the court, he petitioned the government to create the Maryland Court of Special Appeals to ease the workload of his court.  He was also the first chief judge of the Court of Appeals to present to the Maryland General Assembly a "State of the Judiciary" address.  Hammond retired from the court in 1972, and served as a member of the Board of Directors of the Children's Hospital School and South Baltimore General Hospital, amongst other things.

References
Biography from the Maryland Archives

1902 births
1991 deaths
20th-century American judges
20th-century American lawyers
Baltimore City College alumni
Chief Judges of the Maryland Court of Appeals
Gilman School alumni
Johns Hopkins University alumni
Lawyers from Baltimore
Maryland Attorneys General
Maryland lawyers
University of Maryland, Baltimore alumni